Champ is an unincorporated community in Audrain County, in the U.S. state of Missouri.

History
A post office called Champ was established in 1894, and remained in operation until 1901. The community was named after Champ Clark, a state legislator.

References

Unincorporated communities in Audrain County, Missouri
Unincorporated communities in Missouri